Kolunica is a hamlet in the municipality of Surdulica, Serbia. According to the 2002 census, the village has a population of 7 people.

References

Populated places in Pčinja District